The 80th Brigade was a formation of  the British Army. It was originally formed from regular army battalions serving away from home in the British Empire. It was assigned to the 27th Division and served on the Western Front and the Macedonian Front during the First World War.

Brigadier-General Charles Granville Fortescue served as the first commander of this brigade.

Units
The infantry battalions did not all serve at once, but all were assigned to the brigade during the war.
2nd Battalion, King's Shropshire Light Infantry
3rd Battalion, King's Royal Rifle Corps 	 
4th Battalion, King's Royal Rifle Corps
4th Battalion, Rifle Brigade 	 
Princess Patricia's Canadian Light Infantry
80th Machine Gun Company
80th Trench Mortar Battery
80th SAA Section Ammunition Column

References

Infantry brigades of the British Army in World War I